Veronica Webb (born February 25, 1965) is an American model, actress, writer, and television personality. The first African-American to have a major cosmetics contract, Webb has appeared on covers of Vogue, Essence and Elle magazines and on the runway for Victoria's Secret and Chanel.

Biography

Early life 
Webb was born in Detroit, Michigan, the daughter of Marion (née Stewart), a public health doctor , and Leonard Douglas Webb, an electrician. Prior to her birth, both her parents spent 20 years in the Army. She grew up in a working class community. One of Webb's sisters became an oncologist and another is a mathematician.

As a youth, Webb identified with magazine models and women who were involved in the fashion industry, who exhibited control over their appearance. She also enjoyed comic books and dreamed of becoming an animator.

Webb graduated in 1983 from the Detroit Waldorf School and moved to New York to study design.  After a makeup artist saw her in a housewares boutique, Webb dropped out of school to become a model.
She also appeared in the music video for New Order's "Round and Round" off their 1989 album "Technique" and appears briefly in Scritti Politti's Perfect Way video, as well as the 1986 US video for Wood Beez (Pray Like Aretha Franklin), both from their 1985 album Cupid & Psyche 85.

Career 
In New York, Webb pursued a modeling career and eventually became a spokesmodel for Revlon. She was the first black supermodel to win an exclusive contract for a major cosmetics company.  In 1991 Webb made her feature film debut in Spike Lee's Jungle Fever.  Her film credits include Someone Like You..., The Big Tease, and Malcolm X. She also had a recurring role on the television show Damon and appeared on Just Shoot Me!, Becker and Clueless. In 2006, Webb appeared in the independent feature film Dirty Laundry.

As a runway model she has modeled fashions from the collections of Azzedine Alaia, Isaac Mizrahi, Karl Lagerfeld, and Todd Oldham. Webb was named to American Vogue's best dressed list three times.

Webb has written essays and columns for Interview magazine, Paper Magazine ("New York City's style guide to downtown cool"), Panorama (an Italian weekly news magazine), Details, Elle, The Sunday Times, The New York Times Syndicate, Conde Nast's Cookie magazine, and Esquire.

In 1995, she modeled for the first annual show of Victoria's Secret.

In 1998, Miramax Books published Veronica Webb Sight: Adventures In The Big City, a collection of autobiographical essays. Harvey Weinstein, chairman of Miramax, approached her while she was in line at the White House about publishing her essays as a memoir.

Webb was the co-host of the first season of Bravo's Tim Gunn's Guide To Style.

In 2010, Webb was named a member of the Eucerin Skin First Council to promote skin health.

Personal life 
Webb learned French from Azzedine Alaia with whom she lived during her stay in Paris.

Webb dedicates her time to several charitable organizations: LIFEBeat, Product Red and the RPM Nautical Foundation. LIFEBeat is close to Webb's heart because she was deeply affected by the AIDS crisis in the '80s as a model living in New York. Webb got involved with RPM because of her ex-husband, George Robb, who works to bring up shipwrecks for museums and governments.

Webb married George Robb in 2002 and had two children Leila Rose Robb (born October 2002) and Orpheus Blue Robb (born May 2004). The couple divorced in 2009. She married Chris Del Gatto on March 23, 2013.
Webb's hobby is decorating—colors and textiles, and traveling. She also collects shipwreck artifacts and textiles from around the world.

Webb ran the ING New York City Marathon for the first time in 2009 and ran for Harlem United Community AIDS Center.

Filmography 
Jungle Fever
Just Shoot Me! (Season 1, Episode 2: The Devil and Maya Gallo)
 In Too Deep
 The Big Tease
 The West Wing
 Dirty Laundry
 Malcolm X

See also 
List of black fashion models

References

External links 

Veronica Webb Yahoo Group
Veronica Webb's Bio at Bravotv.com

1965 births
African-American actresses
African-American female models
American female models
African-American models
American film actresses
American television actresses
Living people
Actresses from Detroit
Waldorf school alumni
Female models from Michigan